Sven Backhaus (born 1 June 1968) is a German former professional footballer who played as a defender.

References

1968 births
Living people
German footballers
Association football defenders
Bundesliga players
2. Bundesliga players
Austrian Football Bundesliga players
Fortuna Düsseldorf players
FC Energie Cottbus players
SG Wattenscheid 09 players
FC Admira Wacker Mödling players
Wuppertaler SV players
Rot-Weiß Oberhausen players
German expatriate footballers
Expatriate footballers in Austria
German expatriate sportspeople in Austria